Super featherweight, also known as junior lightweight, is a weight division in professional boxing, contested between  and .

The super featherweight division was established by the New York Walker Law in 1920, although first founded by the New York State Athletic Commission (NYSAC) in 1930. The first English champion was "Battling Kid" Nelson in 1914, who lost his title to Benny Berger in 1915. Artie O’Leary also won this title in 1917. This weight class appeared into two distinct historical periods, from 1921 to 1933 and 1960 to the present.

Some of the notable fighters to hold championship titles at this weight include Brian Mitchell , Arturo Gatti, Vasiliy Lomachenko, Flash Elorde, Alexis Argüello, Azumah Nelson, Julio César Chávez, Diego Corrales, Floyd Mayweather Jr., Érik Morales, Marco Antonio Barrera, Acelino Freitas, Juan Manuel Márquez, Oscar De La Hoya, Rocky Lockridge, and Manny Pacquiao. The first World Boxing Association (previously known as the National Boxing Association up until 1962) champion was Johnny Dundee in 1922. The first World Boxing Council champion was Gabriel Elorde in 1963. The inaugural champion for the International Boxing Federation was Hwan-Kil Yuh in 1984. The first World Boxing Organisation champion was John John Molina in 1989.

Current world champions

Current world rankings

The Ring

Keys:
 Current The Ring world champion

BoxRec

As of 12 June 2022.

References

Featherweight